Events in the year 1868 in Norway.

Incumbents
Monarch: Charles IV

Events
21 January – Norwegian Trekking Association is founded.
12 October- The final stretch of the railway line Randsfjordbanen between Drammen and Hønefoss makes Norway's fifth railway complete.
The local newspaper Bergens Tidende was established.

Arts and literature

Births
 
7 February – Johan Throne Holst, industrialist and politician (died 1946)
February – Adolf Østbye, revue artist, made the first Norwegian gramophone record (died 1907)
24 March – Sigvald Hasund, researcher of agriculture, politician and Minister (died 1959)
29 April – Nils Yngvar Ustvedt, medical doctor and politician (died 1938)
9 August – Kitty Wentzel, writer and journalist (died 1961).
15 August – Andreas Nilsen Rygg,  Norwegian-American newspaper editor and author (died 1951)
24 August – Egil Eide, actor and director (died 1946)
25 September – Kristian Birch-Reichenwald Aars, academic (died 1917)

Full date unknown
Adam Egede-Nissen, politician (died 1952)
Katti Anker Møller, feminist, children's rights advocate and pioneer of reproductive rights (died 1945)
Peter Andreas Amundsen Morell, politician and Minister (died 1948)
Rudolf Elias Peersen, politician and Minister (died 1949)
Torjus Værland, politician and Minister (died 1954)

Deaths
23 May – Hans Holmboe, educator and politician (born 1798)
11 August – Halfdan Kjerulf, composer (born 1815)

Full date unknown
Erik Jonsson Helland, Hardanger fiddle maker (born 1816)
Johan Henrik Rye, jurist and politician (born 1787)

See also

References